Xingguo Temple is a Buddhist temple located in Zhangqiu District of Jinan, Shandong.

History
Xingguo Temple was originally built in the Kaihuang period (581–600) of Sui dynasty (581–618) with the name of "Thousand Buddha Temple". The temple had reached unprecedented heyday in the Zhenguan period (627–649) of the Tang dynasty (618–907). Its name was changed into "Xingguo Chan Temple".

After the fall of the Southern Song dynasty (1127–1279), the entirely temple was ruins in wars and natural disasters.

In 1468, in the reign of Chenghua Emperor of the Ming dynasty (1368–1644), Su Xian raised funds to restore the temple on the original site. Four Heavenly Kings Hall, Mahavira Hall, bedrooms and storehouse were added to the temple.

It went through two rebuilds in the Qing dynasty (1644–1911), respectively in the Jiaqing period and Xianfeng period.

During the ten-year Cultural Revolution (1966–1976) the Red Guards had attacked the temple, some of the stone statues of Buddha were slightly damaged in the massive movement.

In 1983, it has been designated as a National Key Buddhist Temple in Han Chinese Area by the State Council of China.

Architecture

The extant structure is based on the Ming and Qing dynasties building principles and retains the traditional architectural style. Main structures from the Shanmen to the Buddhist Texts Library are aligned with the central axis and divided into four countyards.

Shanmen
Under the eaves of the Shanmen is a plaque with the Chinese characters "Xingguo Chan Temple" written by former Venerable Master of the Buddhist Association of China Zhao Puchu. In front of the hall, a wooden plaque with a couplet is hung on the two side pillars. It says "". It was composed and inscribed by Qing dynasty scholar Yang Zhaoqing.

Mahavira Hall
The Mahavira Hall enshrining the Three Saints of Hua-yan. In the middle is Sakyamuni, statues of Manjushri and Samantabhadra stand on the left and right sides of Sakyamuni's statue. In front of Sakyamuni stand Ananda and Kassapa Buddha on the left and right. At the back of Sakyamuni enshrines the statue of Guanyin with Shancai standing on the left and Longnü on the right. The statues of Eighteen Arhats stand on both sides of the hall.

Jade Buddha Hall
The Mahavira Hall houses statues of Sakyamuni, Ksitigarbha and Thousand Armed and Eyed Guanyin. The sitting statue of Sakyamuni is made of jadeite.

Thousand Buddha Cliff
In the Thousand Buddha Cliff that is opposite to the temple, there are many stone statues made by artisans in the Sui and Tang dynasties. The over 200 stone statues are carved with integrate structural and exquisite techniques.

References

External links
 

Buddhist temples in Jinan
Buildings and structures in Jinan
Tourist attractions in Jinan
15th-century establishments in China
15th-century Buddhist temples
Religious buildings and structures completed in 1468